Dinnington is a village and civil parish in the city of Newcastle upon Tyne in Tyne and Wear, England. According to the 2011 Census, Dinnington Parish has 737 households and a population of 1,636; of whom 358 are 65 or over (almost 22%).

The village has been inhabited since well before the Iron Age (700 BC).  Mining has taken place from at least 1715, with the first deep mine being the Augusta Pit at Dinnington Colliery which was sunk in 1867.  1919 saw the formation of Dinnington Parish Council.  In 1974 boundary changes led to the village, previously within Northumberland, being incorporated into the City of Newcastle upon Tyne.

Formerly a coal-mining village with at least four pits within two miles (3 km), Dinnington expanded during the last 40 years of the twentieth century to become a commuter or dormitory village with suburban residential estates and is set for further residential development. Two areas of Green Belt land have been removed to allow 250 private houses to be built and a further 160 have been constructed at Donkey Field.

Situated a 5 minutes' drive from Newcastle International Airport, the village boasts both ease of access to City Centre and beautiful countryside walks or drives. Big Waters, a nature reserve at a subsidence pond, is nearby.

The local school, Dinnington First School has around 140-150 pupils and feeds into Gosforth East Middle School. A statutory notice was issued in October 2017 to increase pupil numbers at Dinnington First School from 150 to 300 pupil places by building a new school on the same Sycamore Avenue site.  It is planned that the school will double its intake and admit up to 60 pupils into the reception class in September 2019.  There will continue to be up to 52 part-time places in the nursery class.

References

External links
GENUKI (accessed: 27 November 2008)
Dinnington First School (accessed: 14 Mat 2010)
Newcastle Residential Areas: Dinnington (accessed: 7 April 2015)

Villages in Tyne and Wear
Civil parishes in Tyne and Wear
Geography of Newcastle upon Tyne